Royal University of Dhaka (RUD) is a non-profit, non-sectarian, private university in Dhaka, Bangladesh. The University Grants Commission (UGC) approved the academic programs on July 30, 2003, and on August 30, 2003, the Ministry of Education approved RUD under the Private University Act, 1992. RUD started functioning in 2004. Momtaz Begum, a philanthropist and social worker, is the founder chairperson. RUD operates at two campuses: the main campus and the permanent campus. The main campus is situated at Dhaka (House No-2, Road No-10, Block-E, Banani) and the permanent campus is located at Plot 404, Tejgaon Industrial Area, Dhaka 1208.

List of vice-chancellors 
 Professor Dr. Nurul Alam Khan (Jan 2010 - May 2011)
 Professor Dr. Subhash Chandra Shil ( present )

Academics
Royal University of Dhaka (RUD)  is a private institution of higher education offering four years undergraduate degrees in Bachelor's in Business Administration (BBA), Hotel Management & Tourism (HMT), Economics, English, Computer Science & Information Technology (CSIT), Computer Science and Engineering (CSE), and Education (B.Ed). Its post-graduate programs are Master of Business Administration (MBA), Master of Science in Computer Science and Engineering (MSCSE),  Master of Science in Library Management and Information Science (MSLMIS), and Master of Arts in Education (M.Ed).

Faculty of Science & Engineering
 B.Sc. in Computer Science and Engineering (CSE) (day/evening)
 B.Sc. in Computer Science & Information Technology (CSIT) (day/evening)
 M.Sc. in Computer Science and Engineering (CSE)
 M.Sc.in Library Management and Information Science (MSLMIS)
The following major/concentrations are offered at the RUD CSE program:
 Software Designing and Development
 Web Solutions
 Data Communication
 Networking
 Hardware Maintenance
 Information Science

Faculty of Business Administration
 BBA (Day/Evening)
 MBA (Day/Evening)
 Executive MBA

The following major/concentrations are offered at the RUD BBA program:
 Human Resource Management
 Business Economics
 Finance
 Marketing
 Accounting

Faculty of Arts & Social Science
 BA in English
 Bachelor of Hotel Management & Tourism (BHMT)
 Bachelor of Arts in Education (B. Ed)
 Master of Arts in Education (M.Ed.)

The department of English is one of the department of RUD which was established with a view of offering instruction in English at the undergraduate level. The syllabus of BA (Honors) creates a balance between literature and linguistics.

Footnotes

External links
 

Educational institutions established in 2003
Private universities in Bangladesh
Universities and colleges in Dhaka
2003 establishments in Bangladesh